Ellie Katherine Brush (born 19 August 1988) is an Australian sportswoman who plays soccer for Canberra United in the Australian A-League Women. She has also played Australian rules football for Greater Western Sydney in the AFL Women's (AFLW).

She also studied physiotherapy at Charles Sturt University.

Club career
Brush joined Canberra United for their inaugural season in 2008 and was named captain, leading the team to the final.

Brush shared the captaincy with Lydia Williams for the 2009 season and has captained all the following seasons, including the 2011/12 season when Canberra United took home the W-League premiership. She received her 50th cap for Canberra United on 5 December 2012 against Perth Glory.

Brush played with the Norwegian team Avaldsnes IL for the 2013 season.

The Houston Dash of the National Women's Soccer League signed Brush on 20 May 2015.

Brush left the Dash via the Re-Entry Wire in 2016 to return to Canberra United.

On 16 September 2017, Brush left Canberra United, due to her difficulties juggling a soccer and AFL career. On 24 September 2017, she joined Western Sydney Wanderers, who due to their good working relationship with  would allow her to play both sports.

Brush has joined Sydney FC for the 2019/20 season.

International career
A strong season in the domestic league led to a call-up to the Matildas team in January 2009, making her international debut in a friendly against Italy. She made her second cap with the Matildas on 24 June 2012 in an international friendly match against New Zealand in Wollongong.

Honours

Club
Canberra United
 W-League Championship: 2011–12, 2014–15
 W-League Premiership: 2011–12, 2013–14

Records
 Most W-League appearances: 94

AFL Women's career
Greater Western Sydney re-signed Brush for the 2018 season during the trade period in May 2017. In August 2020, Brush retired from Australian rules football to focus on soccer.

References

External links

 Canberra United Player's Profile

 Ellie Brush Facebook Athlete Page
 Houston Dash Profile

1988 births
Living people
Greater Western Sydney Giants (AFLW) players
Australian women's soccer players
Canberra United FC players
Western Sydney Wanderers FC (A-League Women) players
Charles Sturt University alumni
Women's association football defenders
Houston Dash players
National Women's Soccer League players
A-League Women players
Australia women's international soccer players
Expatriate women's soccer players in the United States
Australian expatriate sportspeople in the United States
Australian expatriate soccer players
Australian rules footballers from the Australian Capital Territory
Footballers who switched code